The 2011 Fylde Borough Council election took place on 5 May 2011 to elect members of Fylde Borough Council in Lancashire, England. The whole council was up for election and the Conservative Party stayed in overall control of the council.

Election result
The results saw the Conservatives keep a majority of 1 seat on the council with 26 of the 51 councillors, after suffering a net loss of 4 seats. Independents gained seats from the Conservatives in Clifton, Kirkham North and Medlar-with-Wesham wards, while also gaining seats in Freckleton East and Freckleton West after 2 sitting Conservative councillors stood as independents in the election. Overall turnout in the election was 44.6%.

|}

Ward results

Ansdell

Ashton

Central

Clifton

Elswick and Little Eccleston

Fairhaven

Freckleton East

Freckleton West

Heyhouses

Kilnhouse

Kirkham North

Kirkham South

Medlar-with-Wesham

Newton and Treales

Park

Ribby-with-Wrea

Sinleton and Greenhalgh

St John's

St Leonard's

Staining and Weeton

Warton and Westby

References

2011 English local elections
2011
2010s in Lancashire